Robert Burbano (born 27 September 1970) is an Ecuadorian footballer. He played in 14 matches for the Ecuador national football team from 1991 to 2000 . He was also part of Ecuador's squad for the 1991 Copa América tournament.

References

External links
 

1970 births
Living people
Ecuadorian footballers
Ecuador international footballers
Association football midfielders
People from Quevedo, Ecuador